Frances Weston (September 1, 1954 – December 24, 2005), later known as Frances Egan, was a Republican member of the Pennsylvania House of Representatives.

References

Republican Party members of the Pennsylvania House of Representatives
Women state legislators in Pennsylvania
2005 deaths
1954 births
20th-century American women politicians
20th-century American politicians
21st-century American women